Viola Paulitz-Mueller (born 22 March 1967) is a road cyclist from Germany. She represented West-Germany at the 1988 Summer Olympics in the women's road race and Germany at the 1992 Summer Olympics in the women's road race.

References

External links
 profile at sports-reference.com

German female cyclists
Cyclists at the 1992 Summer Olympics
Cyclists at the 1988 Summer Olympics
Olympic cyclists of Germany
Living people
Sportspeople from Hildesheim
Olympic cyclists of West Germany
West German female cyclists
1967 births
Cyclists from Lower Saxony
20th-century German women
21st-century German women